The Electric Aircraft Corporation Electra 1 is an American electric motor for powering electric aircraft, designed and produced by Electric Aircraft Corporation of Cliffside Park, New Jersey.

The engine is normally sold in a package that includes "motor, electronic controller, power dial and switch, fuse, connectors, ammeter and shunt, voltmeter, custom machined propeller hub, and digital motor temperature display with probe."

Design and development
The Electra 1 is a brushed 74 volt design producing .  It has an 85% efficiency. The low working rpm of the engine means that it can turn a propeller at efficient speeds without the need for a reduction drive.

Applications
Electric Aircraft Corporation ElectraFlyer Trike

Specifications (Electra 1)

See also

References

External links

Aircraft electric engines